Uganda National Congress (UNC) was the first political party in Uganda.

UNC formed
Formed on Sunday 2 March 1952, Ignatius Kangave Musaazi was its first President, and Abubaker Kakyama Mayanja the party's first Secretary General. Apollo K. Kironde was the legal advisor to the party.

Six founding figures
The six men who founded the party were: Ignatius Kangave Musaazi (Buganda), Abubakar Kakyama Mayanja (Buganda), Stefano Abwangoto (Bugisu), Ben Okwerede (Teso), Yekosofati Engur (Lango) and S.B. Katembo (Toro).

UNC conceived at Musajjalumbwa's house
The UNC was conceived at Musajjalumbwa's house located on what is now Musajjalumbwa Road, near the Lubiri (Kabaka's palace), at Mengo. In 1951, Ignatius Musaazi rented part of the ground floor of Musajjalumbwa's house, a house of the late Yakobo Musajjalumbwa, who was a Treasurer (Omuwanika) in the Buganda Kingdom. At this house, a lot of work was done which resulted in the creation of the UNC. The party did much to help achieve Uganda's independence from Great Britain on Tuesday 9 October1962.

UNC involvement in the struggle for independence in Africa
The UNC was involved in the struggle for independence in Africa. In Cairo (Egypt) John Kale represented the UNC and co-ordinated the struggle for the independence of African Countries. Abu Mayanja and John Kale established a UNC office in Cairo to link up with contacts all over the world in order to assist freedom fighters in Africa.

The Secretary General of the UNC, Abu Mayanja, used his close relationship with the then Chinese leader Mao Tse-tung and Prime Minister Zhou Enlai, to secure support for African freedom fighters involved in the struggle for independence in Africa.
The UNC received £500,000 from China, as well as a modern printing press for the UNC from Italy. The printing press was installed in offices of two Ugandan newspapers at the time, namely The Uganda Post and The Uganda Express, which were based at Kololo in Kampala.

Other political parties formed in Uganda
Following the birth of the UNC, other political parties were formed. In 1956, DP (Democratic Party) was formed. In March 1960, UPC - Uganda People's Congress party was formed. 
After the 1958 general election in Uganda, seven unaffiliated members of the Uganda Legislative Council (which was in effect Parliament in those colonial days), formed the Uganda People's Union.

Split in the UNC
In 1960 there was a split in the UNC party: there was a Musaazi faction and an Apollo Milton Obote-led faction. The Uganda People's Union together with the Obote-led faction of the UNC, got together and formed a new party, the Uganda People's Congress (UPC) in March 1960.
The DP and UPC parties became major political parties in Uganda. The UNC became less of a force, mainly because DP became popular and a new party emerged: Kabaka Yekka party  (KY).

References

1952 establishments in Uganda
Defunct political parties in Uganda
Political parties established in 1952
Socialism in Uganda
Socialist parties in Africa